Fritz-Olof Thunberg (21 May 1925 – 24 February 2020) was a Swedish actor and director, perhaps best known as the voice of the cartoon character Bamse.

Life and career 
Thunberg was born Fritz-Olof Thunberg in Västerås, where he formed a theatre club called Scenklubben which also included Lars Ekborg and the poet Bo Setterlind. He studied at Calle Flygare's drama school in Stockholm and then from 1950 to 1952 at Dramatens elevskola; between the two, in the late 1940s, he performed in public parks.

After finishing drama school, Thunberg joined the provincial East Gothland Theatre (Östgötateatern), where he directed in addition to acting, then became a freelance actor. In the 1950s he became known for his work on the radio programme Mannen i svart ("The Man in Black"), where he presented all kinds of stories of horror and the supernatural in his deep voice, accompanied by a variety of sound effects. In 1963, he had a supporting role in Ingmar Bergman's drama Winter Light as the church organist Fredrik.

Thunberg appeared in a variety of films, often in a supporting role as a confident charmer, and is the voice of both Bamse and Agaton Sax in children's films and recordings. He also voiced Shere Khan in the Swedish-dubbed versions of both the 1967 Disney The Jungle Book and its 2003 sequel, The Jungle Book 2.

In 2006, Thunberg was a host of Sommar on Sveriges Radio P1.

Thunberg also directed for television.

Personal life 

Thunberg was previously married to Ingrid Johansson. He had a later cohabitation with actress , whom he got to know in connection with a radio play. He was the father of actor Svante Thunberg and father-in-law of opera singer Malena Ernman, from whom his granddaughter is the climate activist Greta Thunberg.

In 1959, Thunberg became engaged to actress Lena Granhagen, whom he had met while directing a play in which she acted in at Intiman. They lived together into the 1960s, and they acted together as a couple in the television series Villervalle i Söderhavet in 1963.

Thunberg died on 24 February 2020, at the age of 94.

Selected filmography 
1948 – De kämpade sig till frihet
1953 – I dur och skur
1953 – The Beat of Wings in the Night
1954 – Laugh Bomb
1955 – Lady and the Tramp Trusty (Swedish voice; also in 1989 re-dub); Boris (in original 1955 dub only)
1955 – Wild Birds
1955 – People of the Finnish Forests 
1956 – 7 vackra flickor
1957 – A Dreamer's Journey 
1957 – The Halo Is Slipping
1957 – The Minister of Uddarbo 
1957 – Vägen genom Skå
1958 – Fridolf Stands Up! 
1959 – Fröken Chic (uncredited)
1959 – A Lion in Town 
1960 – The Die Is Cast
1960 – Summer and Sinners 
1961 – One Hundred and One Dalmatians: Colonel (Swedish voice, original 1961 dub only)
1961 – Pärlemor
1963 – Det är hos mig han har varit
1963 – Winter Light
1963 – Adam och Eva
1963 – Prins Hatt under jorden
1964 – Äktenskapsbrottaren
1967 – The Jungle Book: Shere Khan (Swedish voice)
1968 – Villervalle i Söderhavet
1976 – Smurfarna och den förtrollade flöjten: narrator, Fräckelin (voice)
1977 – The Rescuers: Rufus (Swedish voice)
1980 – Sverige åt svenskarna
1981 – The Fox and the Hound: Grumpy Badger (Swedish voice)
1982 – Snow White and the Seven Dwarfs: Grumpy (Swedish voice)
1986 – Amorosa
1988 – The Land Before Time: narrator (Swedish voice)
1996 – Monopol
1996 – Lilla Jönssonligan och cornflakeskuppen
1997 – Lilla Jönssonligan på styva linan
2001 – Lady and the Tramp II: Scamp's Adventure: Trusty (Swedish voice)
2001 – Monsters, Inc.: C.E.O. Henry J. Waternoose III (Swedish voice)
2003 – The Jungle Book 2: Shere Khan (Swedish voice)
Source:

Selected television appearances 
1963 – Villervalle i Söderhavet (series)
1965 – En historia till fredag (series)
1965 – Niklasons (series)
1966 – Mästerdetektiven Blomkvist på nya äventyr
1968 – Lärda fruntimmer
1968 – Pygmalion
1968 – Markurells i Wadköping (series)
1969 – Biprodukten
1969 – Håll polisen utanför (series)
1970 – Röda rummet (series)
1970 – Regnbågslandet (series)
1970 – Ett dockhem
1972–1974 – Bröderna Malm (series)
1972–1973 – Bamse (series): narrator, voices
1973 – Ett köpmanshus i skärgården (TV-serie)
1981 – Bamse och den lilla åsnan: narrator, voices
1982 – Dubbelsvindlarna (series)
1991 – Bamse i Trollskogen: narrator, voices
1991 – Storstad (series)
1991 – Sunes jul (series)
1993 – Allis med is (series)
1994 – Tre Kronor (series)
1995 – Sjukan (series)
1995 – Jeppe på berget (series)
2001 – Återkomsten (series)
2003 – Solbacken: Avd. E (series)
Sources:

Selected directions 
1972 – Söndagspromenaden (TV)
1969 – Galgmannen (TV)

References

External links 

"Olof Thunberg" at Nationalencyklopedin  (registration required)

1925 births
2020 deaths
Olof
People from Västerås
Sommar (radio program) hosts
Swedish film directors
Swedish male film actors
Swedish male stage actors
Swedish male television actors
Swedish male voice actors
Swedish television directors
20th-century Swedish male actors
21st-century Swedish male actors